Hermann Hirt (19 December 1865 in Magdeburg – 12 September 1936 in Gießen) was a German philologist and Indo-Europeanist.

Biography 
Hirt wrote on German metres (Untersuchungen zur westgermanischen Verskunst, 1889), edited Schopenhauer's Parerga (1890), and then devoting himself to Indo-Germanic philology made special studies on accent, writing Der indogermanische Accent (1895) and Der indogermanische Ablaut, vornehmlich in seinem Verhältnis zur Betonung (1900). Hirt, who became professor at the University of Leipzig, made valuable contributions to Brugmann and Streitberg's Indogermanische Forschungen, on the morphology of case endings. In 1902, he published Handbuch der griechischen Laut- und Formenlehre, the first volume of a series of Indo-Germanic text-books of which he was editor. He is the author of the Indogermanische Grammatik, published in seven volumes between 1921 and 1937.  Hirt made foundational contributions to the study of Proto-Indo-European language accent and ablaut.

Bibliography
 Hirt H (1895). Der indogermanische Akzent. Strassburg:Trübner.
 Hirt H (1900). Der indogermanische Ablaut, vornehmlich in seinem Verhältnis zur Betonung. Strassburg: Trübner.
 Hirt H (1902). Handbuch der griechischen Laut- und Formenlehre (2nd edn., 1912). Strassburg: Trübner.
 Hirt H (1905–1907). Die Indogermanen. Ihre Verbreitung, ihre Heimat und ihre Kultur (2 vols). Strassburg: Trübner.
 Hirt H (1909). Etymologie der neuhochdeutschen Sprache. München: Beck (2nd edn., 1921).
 Hirt H (1921–1937). Indogermanische Grammatik (7 vols). Heidelberg: Winter.
 Hirt H (1931–1934). Handbuch des Urgermanischen (3 vols). Heidelberg: Winter.
 Hirt H (1939). Hauptprobleme der indogermanischen Sprachwissenschaft. Hrsg. und bearbeitet von H. Arntz. Halle: Niemeyer.
 Hirt H (1940). Indogermanica. Forschungen über Sprache und Geschichte Alteuropas. Halle: Niemeyer.

References

External links 
 Portrait at Titus Galeria

1865 births
1936 deaths
Linguists from Germany
Indo-Europeanists
Linguists of Indo-European languages
Linguists of Germanic languages
Academic staff of Leipzig University
German philologists